The Witcher is a series of six fantasy novels and 15 short stories written by Polish author Andrzej Sapkowski. The series revolves around the eponymous "witcher", Geralt of Rivia. In Sapkowski's works, "witchers" are beast hunters who develop supernatural abilities at a young age to battle wild beasts and monsters. The Witcher began with a titular 1986 short story that Sapkowski entered into a competition held by Fantastyka magazine, marking his debut as an author. Due to reader demand, Sapkowski wrote 14 more stories before starting a series of novels in 1994. Known as The Witcher Saga, he wrote one book a year until the fifth and final installment in 1999. A standalone prequel novel, Season of Storms, was published in 2013.

The books have been described as having a cult following in Poland and Central and Eastern European countries. They have been translated into 37 languages and sold over 15 million copies worldwide as of December 2019. They have also been adapted into a film (The Hexer), two television series (The Hexer and The Witcher), several video games, and two comic book series. The video games have been even more successful, with more than 50 million copies sold as of May 2020.

Overview

Production

Short stories

In 1985, Andrzej Sapkowski was a 38-year-old traveling fur salesman with an economics degree and a love of fantasy literature. He decided to enter a short story competition, limited to 30-pages, held by Polish science fiction and fantasy magazine Fantastyka. He did so at the urging of his son Krzysztof, who was an avid reader of the magazine. Sapkowski submitted "The Witcher" (1986), which was conceived as a retelling of a Polish fairy tale where a princess turned into a monster as punishment for the incest of her parents. He had to wait about a year for the results of the contest, and came in third place. Sapkowski felt that his work was the best in the competition, but the jurors relegated it to third because fantasy was considered to be for children at the time in Poland. However, reaction from readers was overwhelmingly positive and Sapkowski wrote more stories, about one or two a year, in response to their demand.

He based "A Question of Price" (and later "Sword of Destiny") on the universally known fairy tale in which a monster or sorcerer saves somebody's life and then demands payment. The first four stories dealing with the witcher Geralt of Rivia were collected into a 1990 short story collection titled The Witcher — now out of print — by publisher Reporter. It includes 1988's "The Road with No Return" ("Droga, z której się nie wraca"), which is set before The Witcher stories and features Geralt's mother-to-be.

After what he called a chance meeting, Sapkowski made a deal in 1990 with SuperNowa to publish the series. They released the second short story collection, Sword of Destiny, in 1992. The Last Wish was published by SuperNowa in 1993 to replace The Witcher as the first book, and includes all of its stories except "The Road with No Return" (the only story without Geralt). Although new short stories were also added to The Last Wish, they chronologically take place before those in Sword of Destiny.

"Something Ends, Something Begins" ("Coś się kończy, coś się zaczyna") is an alternate ending to The Witcher Saga about Geralt and Yennefer's wedding that was written in 1992 as a wedding gift for Sapkowski's friends. It and "The Road with No Return" are included in some Polish editions of The Last Wish or Sword of Destiny.

The Witcher Saga and Season of Storms
With the positive reader reception to his short stories, Sapkowski decided to write a fantasy saga. He claimed that Polish publishers at the time believed only Anglo-Saxon fantasy authors were worth publishing and that Polish writers of the genre were too risky. SuperNowa were the only publisher willing to take the risk, and "Now everybody envies" them. For the saga, the author expanded on the story he used for "A Question of Price" and "Sword of Destiny". Blood of Elves, the first novel in The Witcher Saga, was published in 1994. The story focuses on Geralt of Rivia and Ciri, who are linked by destiny. Ciri, princess of a recently conquered country and a pawn of international politics, becomes a witcher-in-training. Geralt is drawn into a whirlwind of events in his attempts to protect her.

Three more novels quickly followed at a pace of one a year; Time of Contempt (1995), Baptism of Fire (1996), and The Tower of the Swallow (1997). The fifth and final installment, The Lady of the Lake, was published in 1999.

After 14 years, Sapkowski released Season of Storms in 2013. Set between short stories included in The Last Wish, it is a standalone prequel to The Witcher Saga. In 2020, Sapkowski stated that he had "some plans" for a new entry in The Witcher, but "My future plans are vague, nothing is fixed yet".

Non-Witcher anthologies
Coś się kończy, coś się zaczyna (Something Ends, Something Begins) is a 2000 collection of short stories by Sapkowski, including two from The Witcher: "The Road with No Return" and "Something Ends, Something Begins". Published in 2012, Maladie i inne opowiadania (Maladie and Other Stories) is another Sapkowski short story collection that includes "The Road with No Return" and "Something Ends, Something Begins".

Chosen by Fate: Zajdel Award Winner Anthology is a 2000 English anthology by SuperNowa, in cooperation with the Silesian Club of Fantasy Literature, that includes a translation by Agnieszka Fulińska of "The Witcher" short story entitled "The Hexer". 2010's A Polish Book of Monsters is an English anthology edited and translated by Michael Kandel that includes a translation of "The Witcher" entitled "Spellmaker". Maladie and Other Stories (not to be confused with the above Polish book of the same name) is a 2014 English e-book sampler with translations of "The Witcher", "The Edge of the World", and the first chapters of Blood of Elves and Baptism of Fire.

Spin-offs
With Sapkowski's permission, the Polish publishing house Solaris published a collection of eight short stories entitled  (Tales from the World of The Witcher). Written by Russian and Ukrainian fantasy writers (including Andrei Belyanin and Vladimir Vasilyev), they are set in the world of The Witcher and feature its characters; 
Vasilyev story is part of his The Witcher of Grand Kiev universe. Szpony i kły (Claws and Fangs), a similar collection of eleven short stories by authors chosen through a 2016 competition by the Polish magazine Nowa Fantastyka, was published in 2017 by SuperNowa.

Setting
When he first created The Witcher, Sapkowski had not thought up any background on the world of the series, "I began with short stories; you don't create universes in short stories, there is—literally and metaphorically—no place for them". But when he switched to writing full novels, "the necessity of some coherent background became imminent. And slowly, step by step, something resembling a universe started to emerge. But it's only in the background, so it plays a secondary role in the story". Although admitting to using Slavic mythology often due to it being "very rich" and abundant, Sapkowski said he does not have any preferred mythologies, folklores or bestiaries that he draws on for monsters in The Witcher; "The story dictates the necessity. And, mostly, I put aside existing mythologies and invent something myself". He said that the monsters in the series can be put into one of three categories. First, those that already "exist" with established names, appearances, habits and habitats, such as dragons. Second are those that he invents but gives names that can be found in nature, mostly insects because they are "horrible and scary". Third are those that are completely original creations, some of which are only named, because, "When it has no importance as far as the storyline is concerned whatsoever, why bother?" The author has also stated that he personally abhors politics and considers his books to be politically neutral.

Background
The stories are set on an unnamed Continent, which was settled several thousand years earlier by elves from overseas. When they arrived, the elves encountered gnomes and dwarves. After a war between the elves and dwarves, the dwarves retreated into the mountains, and the elves settled in the plains and forests. Human colonists arrived about five hundred years before the events in the stories, igniting a series of wars. The humans were victorious and became dominant; the non-human races, now considered second-class citizens, often live in small ghettos within human settlements. Those not confined to the ghettos live in wilderness regions not yet claimed by humans. Other races on the Continent are halflings and dryads; werewolves and vampires appeared after a magical event known as the Conjunction of the Spheres.

During the centuries preceding the stories, most of the Continent's southern regions have been taken over by the Nilfgaard Empire; the north belongs to the fragmented Northern Kingdoms. The Witcher Saga takes place in the aftermath of the first major war between the Nilfgaard Empire and the Northern Kingdoms, with a second war beginning in the middle of the series.

Major characters

 Geralt of Rivia (Polish: Geralt z Rivii), also known as Gwynbleidd (Elder Speech: "White Wolf") and the Butcher of Blaviken, is the protagonist of the series and its adaptations, a witcher who travels the Continent and makes a living hunting monsters that plague the land. He is linked to Ciri by destiny. Péter Apor argues that he embodies the "neo-liberal anti-politics" spirit of the Polish popular culture of the 1990s. Geralt has been played by Michał Żebrowski in the Polish shows and movies. Currently he is played by Henry Cavill in the Netflix series The Witcher.
 Cirilla Fiona Elen Riannon (known as "Ciri", from the name Zireael in Elder Speech (meaning "Swallow"; Polish: Jaskółka)), also known as the Lion Cub of Cintra, Child of the Elder Blood, Falka, and the Lady of Time and Space. Cirilla is the princess of Cintra, daughter of Pavetta and Duny (also known as the Urcheon of Erlenwald) and granddaughter of Queen Calanthe. She is also Geralt's destiny and adopted daughter, and the focus of much of the plot. Ciri is a descendant of Lara Dorren and has the Elder blood, which gives her access to powers that allow her to cross space and time. Ciri has ashen grey hair and green emerald eyes, a trait that runs in her family.
Yennefer of Vengerberg (Polish: Yennefer z Vengerbergu) first appeared in the collection of short stories, The Last Wish, featuring in the short story of the same name. She is a powerful sorceress, is a mother figure to Ciri, and becomes Geralt's lover. As an avid reader of fantasy, Sapkowski said he was sometimes bored and disgusted with stories in which the hero could easily have sex with any woman he wished, so he created Yennefer to "complicate things a little" as a woman character who refuses to be a fantasy cliché. In the Polish 2002 film and 2002 TV series, she was played by Grażyna Wolszczak and by Anya Chalotra in the Netflix series.
Dandelion (Polish: Jaskier) is a poet, minstrel, bard and Geralt's best friend. The Polish word jaskier refers to the Buttercup flower (Ranunculus). Some of his more famous ballads were about the relationship between Geralt and Yennefer. By the time of the saga, he is already in his 40s though it is said that he appears to be in his 30s and is sometimes mistaken for an elf. He accompanies Geralt in many short stories and ends up joining his hansa while searching for Ciri. He is played by Joey Batey in The Witcher TV series. In the 2001 Polish Wiedźmin film, he was played by Zbigniew Zamachowski.
Triss Merigold is a sorceress and a friend of Geralt and Yennefer. She took care of Ciri for some time and is like an older sister to her. She was a member of the Lodge of Sorceresses. Triss is in love with Geralt. The image of Triss Merigold from The Witcher 2: Assassins of Kings appeared as cover girl in the Polish edition of Playboy in May 2011. She also appeared in a live model calendar for the game in Russia.

Geography
Although no map of the universe created by Sapkowski has been released, fans have created several maps. According to Sapkowski, the existing maps are "mostly accurate", and he uses a version created by Czech translator Stanislav Komárek.

The Continent can be divided into four regions. The Northern Kingdoms (where most of the saga occurs) consists of Aedirn, Cidaris, Cintra, Hengfors League, Kaedwen, Kerack, Kovir and Poviss, Lyria and Rivia, Redania, Temeria and Verden and several minor duchies and principalities such as Bremervoord or Ellander. The Nilfgaard Empire occupies most of the area south of the Northern Kingdoms. The eastern part of the Continent, such as the Korath desert, Zerrikania, Hakland and the Fiery Mountains, is mostly unknown. The book series mentions overseas countries with whom the Northern Kingdoms trade, including Zangvebar, Ofir, Hannu and Barsa.

Language
Sapkowski created a language for the series known as Elder Speech, based on Welsh, English, French, Irish, Latin and other languages. Dialects are spoken on the Skellige Islands and in Nilfgaard. In an interview, Sapkowski explained that he wanted the language to be reasonably legible to a reader, to avoid footnotes. As he said: "In my book, I do not want for an orc telling to another orc 'Burbatuluk grabataluk!' to be supplied with a footnote: 'Shut the door, don't let the flies in!'"

Chronology

"The Road with No Return" – untranslated
"A Grain of Truth"
"The Lesser Evil"
"The Edge of the World"
"The Last Wish"
"A Question of Price"Season of Storms"The Witcher"
"The Voice of Reason"
"The Bounds of Reason"
"A Shard of Ice"
"Eternal Flame"
"A Little Sacrifice"
"Sword of Destiny"
"Something More"Blood of ElvesTime of ContemptBaptism of FireThe Tower of the SwallowThe Lady of the LakeEpilogue to the Season of Storms"Something Ends, Something Begins" (alternative ending) – untranslated

Translations
The stories and novels have been translated into 37 languages worldwide. Sapkowski denied having any involvement in the English translations, explaining, if the translator "is polite enough, sometimes he asks me questions, sometimes he presents me with a fragment of the first page, but it is his own will – I have nothing to do with it". When asked his opinion on the quality of the translation, the original author stated, "We Poles, we say, 'Translations are like women: if they are beautiful, they are not true; if they are true, they are not beautiful.' I speak some 15 languages so for me it's very easy to read the translations and see if they are good or not. Sometimes it's terrible; sometimes I'm very happy because the spirit, the spirit, is in the translation".

The name "Witcher"

Sapkowski chose wiedźmin as the male equivalent of the Polish word for witch (wiedźma). In his book 2005 book-interview Historia i fantastyka, Sapkowski noted that the word "witcher" is a natural male version of the English word "witch", and implied that the similarity between those two words, as well as between the German terms, was the inspiration coining wiedźmin as a new Polish word. Polish video game designer Adrian Chmielarz claimed to have invented the translation of wiedźmin into English as witcher around 1996–1997.

Although wiedźmin is now usually translated into English as "witcher", an earlier translation of the title was "hexer" (the title of the 2001 film adaptation and the first official English translation in the 2000 short story collection Chosen by Fate: Zajdel Award Winner Anthology); Hexe and Hexer are the German words for female and male 'witch' respectively. CD Projekt used "witcher" for the title of its 2007 English release of the video game, and Danusia Stok used it in her translation of Ostatnie życzenie that was published the same year. Michael Kandel however used "spellmaker" in his 2010 translation of the "Wiedźmin" short story for A Book of Polish Monsters anthology.

ReceptionThe Witcher series has been described as having a cult following in Poland and Central and Eastern European countries. They have been translated into 37 languages and sold over 15 million copies worldwide as of December 2019. Two weeks after the Netflix TV adaptation was released in 2020, revenue from the books was reportedly up 562% compared to the same period in 2018. Entries in The Witcher series have earned Sapkowski the Janusz A. Zajdel Award three times; "The Lesser Evil" (1990), "Sword of Destiny" (1992), and Blood of Elves (1994). The Last Wish won the 2003 Premio Ignotus for Best Anthology. Blood of Elves won Best Novel at the first David Gemmell Awards for Fantasy in 2009.

In October 2018, Sapkowski's hometown of Łódź officially renamed a garden square Witcher Square (Skwer Wiedźmina) and announced plans to add benches, swings and other installations based on the series to the area. In October 2021, a mural of Geralt was painted on the side of a skyscraper in Łódź. Spanning three 70-meter-high walls and covering almost 2,000 sq/m, it is the largest mural in Poland and one of the largest in the world.

Adaptations
Comic books
From 1993 to 1995, Sapkowski's stories were adapted into six-issue comic books The Witcher by Maciej Parowski and Sapkowski (story), Bogusław Polch (art).
In 2011, Egmont released a 2-part comic book, titled Reasons of State, containing an original story. It was written by Michał Gałek, illustrated by Arkadiusz Klimek, and colorized by Łukasz Poller.

In 2013, Dark Horse Comics announced a comic book series likewise called The Witcher, based on the video-game series and made in collaboration with CD Projekt Red. It began publishing in 2014. Most of the stories are based on original plots not written by Sapkowski, with different writers and artists working on different issues.
In October 2015, a one-shot webcomic, titled Matters of Conscience, was released by CD PROJEKT RED that expanded on after the events in the second game.
 Video games 

In 2007, a video game developed by CD Projekt Red was released, The Witcher. A sequel, The Witcher 2: Assassins of Kings, was released in 2011 by the same team. The final game of the trilogy, The Witcher 3: Wild Hunt, was released in 2015. Sapkowski had no involvement with the video games, giving the studio license to create a completely new story using his characters. All three games were positively received, with Metacritic giving them an 81, an 88, and a 93 out of 100 respectively. They were also extremely successful commercially, selling more than 50 million copies as of May 2020, over 30 million copies being from The Witcher 3: Wild Hunt alone.

CD Projekt Red developed a card game named "Gwent" that was included in The Witcher 3: Wild Hunt as an in-game activity. They have created two stand-alone video games based on it, titled Gwent: The Witcher Card Game and Thronebreaker: The Witcher Tales, both released in 2018.

A remake of The Witcher was announced in October 2022, which was formerly first teased under the codename "Canis Majoris". Entitled The Witcher Remake, it will be developed using Unreal Engine 5, the same engine in use for the planned second trilogy. Fool's Theory will mainly develop the remake with full creative supervision from The Witcher series staff and CD Projekt Red.

Film and televisionThe Witcher was adapted into a 2002 TV series and a shorter 2001 film version a both titled The Hexer (Wiedźmin) and directed by Marek Brodzki. Michał Żebrowski portrayed Geralt. In several interviews, Sapkowski has criticized these screen adaptations: "I can answer only with a single word, an obscene, albeit a short one."

In 2015, Platige Image planned an American film adaptation of the novel series to arrive in 2017. In May 2017, they announced that they would be producing a The Witcher TV series in cooperation with Netflix and Sean Daniel Company, with Tomasz Bagiński as one of the directors and Sapkowski as a creative consultant. Created by Lauren Schmidt Hissrich, it stars Henry Cavill as Geralt. On October 10, 2018, it was announced that Freya Allan and Anya Chalotra had been cast as main female characters, Ciri and Yennefer. The first season was released on December 20, 2019, with all eight episodes available. A second season was announced on November 13, 2019. All eight episodes were released on December 17, 2021, featuring many of the same characters and some new stars. In September 2021, Netflix renewed the series for a third season. Starting in the show's fourth season, Liam Hemsworth is scheduled to replace Cavill as Geralt.

Netflix released an animated film, The Witcher: Nightmare of the Wolf, on August 23, 2021, with their TV series showrunner Lauren Schmidt Hissrich as producer and writer BeAu DeMayo, and animation provided by Studio Mir.

A live-action prequel series, The Witcher: Blood Origin, was released by Netfliy, set 1200 years before Geralt's time to show the origin of the Witchers developed by Hissrich.

 Tabletop RPGs 
A tabletop role-playing game based on Sapkowski's books, Wiedźmin: Gra Wyobraźni (The Witcher: A Game of Imagination), was published by MAG in 2001.

Another tabletop RPG based on the video games, produced by R. Talsorian Games, was planned for release in 2016 but was delayed and finally released in August 2018.

 Board games 
CD Projekt Red and Fantasy Flight Games released The Witcher Adventure Game, a board game designed by Ignacy Trzewiczek, in 2014 in physical and digital forms. The digital version is available on Windows, OS X, Android and iOS.

The board game The Witcher: Old World was announced in February 2021. Designed by Łukasz Woźniak and produced by Go on Board in partnership with CD Projekt Red, the game is set prequel to the main video game series with deck building and role-playing elements. In May 2021, the game raised more than $3 million on Kickstarter and was planned to be shipped in June 2022.

 Card games 
In 2007, Kuźnia Gier developed two card games based on CD Projekt's The Witcher video game. One, Wiedźmin: Przygodowa Gra Karciana (The Witcher: Adventure Cardgame), was published by Kuźnia Gier; the other, Wiedźmin: Promocyjna Gra Karciana (The Witcher Promo Card Game) was added to the "Collector's Edition" of The Witcher in some countries.

 Rock opera and musical 
A rock opera and a musical entitled The Road of No Return'' based on the series were produced by Russian symphonic rock band ESSE in 2009 and 2011–2012 respectively.

Notes

References

External links

 Novel series
 Official website of Andrzej Sapkowski 
 

 Video game series
 Official website

 
Book series introduced in 1986
Family saga novels
Polish fantasy
Polish novels
Polish short stories
Novels adapted into comics
Novels adapted into video games
Polish novels adapted into television shows
Polish novels adapted into films
Slavic mythology in popular culture